The NBR B Class (LNER Class J35) is a class of 0-6-0 steam locomotive designed by William Paton Reid for freight work on the North British Railway.  They were introduced in 1906 and had inside cylinders and Stephenson valve gear. The first eighteen locomotives had piston valves and the remainder had slide valves.

Classification
Seventy-six locomotives were built and these passed to the London and North Eastern Railway (LNER) in 1923. The LNER classified them as follows:
 J35/1 Engines with piston valves
 J35/2 Engines with piston valves and short fireboxes
 J35/3 Engines with slide valves

The entire class was fitted with superheaters between 1923 and 1942 and re-classified from 1937 as follows:

 J35/4 Engines with superheaters and slide valves
 J35/5 Engines with superheaters and piston valves

Numbering
Seventy locomotives of classes J35/4 and J35/5 came into British Railways (BR) ownership at nationalisation in 1948 and were numbered as follows:
 Class J35/5, 64460-64477
 Class J35/4, 64478-64535

References

External links 

 Class J35/4 Details at Rail UK
 Class J35/5 Details at Rail UK

B
0-6-0 locomotives
Railway locomotives introduced in 1906
NBL locomotives
Scrapped locomotives
Standard gauge steam locomotives of Great Britain
Freight locomotives